Onewhero is a village and rural community in the Waikato District and Waikato region of New Zealand's North Island. 

Pukekohe and Tuakau are located north of Onewhero, across the Waikato River;

The name Onewhero translates from Maori as "Red Earth", which describes the soil colour typical in the Franklin region.

The Onewhero village consists of an Anglican church, school, fire station, garage, lawn bowls club and tennis club. The Onewhero Society of Performing Arts runs a local performing arts theatre, and the local rugby club hosts community events and community board meetings. The Onewhero Golf Club is located in nearby Pukekawa.

The local Te Awamaarahi marae is a meeting ground for the Waikato Tainui hapū of Ngāti Āmaru, Ngāti Pou and Ngāti Tiipa. It includes the wharenui (meeting house) of Whare Wōnanga.

North of  Onewhero, Harker Reserve has  (or 20m) high Te Wai Heke O Maoa, or Vivian Falls, and a  bush walkway. It is near the end of Miller Rd. The waterfall goes over the edge of South Auckland volcanic field's Onewhero maar crater, falling onto Miocene aged Carter Siltstone.

Demographics
Onewhero is in three SA1 statistical areas which cover . The SA1 areas are part of the larger Onewhero statistical area.

The SA1 areas had a population of 552 at the 2018 New Zealand census, an increase of 15 people (2.8%) since the 2013 census, and an increase of 27 people (5.1%) since the 2006 census. There were 201 households, comprising 285 males and 270 females, giving a sex ratio of 1.06 males per female, with 108 people (19.6%) aged under 15 years, 72 (13.0%) aged 15 to 29, 288 (52.2%) aged 30 to 64, and 87 (15.8%) aged 65 or older.

Ethnicities were 93.5% European/Pākehā, 13.0% Māori, 3.3% Pacific peoples, 3.3% Asian, and 1.1% other ethnicities. People may identify with more than one ethnicity.

Although some people chose not to answer the census's question about religious affiliation, 59.2% had no religion, 29.9% were Christian, 0.5% had Māori religious beliefs, 0.5% were Buddhist and 1.6% had other religions.

Of those at least 15 years old, 84 (18.9%) people had a bachelor's or higher degree, and 84 (18.9%) people had no formal qualifications. 111 people (25.0%) earned over $70,000 compared to 17.2% nationally. The employment status of those at least 15 was that 252 (56.8%) people were employed full-time, 78 (17.6%) were part-time, and 6 (1.4%) were unemployed.

Onewhero statistical area

Onewhero statistical area had a population of 1,605 at the 2018 New Zealand census, an increase of 63 people (4.1%) since the 2013 census, and an increase of 120 people (8.1%) since the 2006 census. There were 552 households, comprising 822 males and 783 females, giving a sex ratio of 1.05 males per female. The median age was 40.8 years (compared with 37.4 years nationally), with 357 people (22.2%) aged under 15 years, 243 (15.1%) aged 15 to 29, 813 (50.7%) aged 30 to 64, and 189 (11.8%) aged 65 or older.

Ethnicities were 83.4% European/Pākehā, 21.5% Māori, 3.7% Pacific peoples, 4.3% Asian, and 1.3% other ethnicities. People may identify with more than one ethnicity.

The percentage of people born overseas was 18.5, compared with 27.1% nationally.

Although some people chose not to answer the census's question about religious affiliation, 56.4% had no religion, 30.5% were Christian, 1.7% had Māori religious beliefs, 0.7% were Hindu, 0.2% were Buddhist and 1.1% had other religions.

Of those at least 15 years old, 216 (17.3%) people had a bachelor's or higher degree, and 234 (18.8%) people had no formal qualifications. The median income was $37,600, compared with $31,800 nationally. 261 people (20.9%) earned over $70,000 compared to 17.2% nationally. The employment status of those at least 15 was that 738 (59.1%) people were employed full-time, 186 (14.9%) were part-time, and 42 (3.4%) were unemployed.

Education

References

External links 
Onewhero local directory

Waikato District
Populated places in Waikato
Populated places on the Waikato River